John Jones Ross  (August 16, 1831 – May 4, 1901) was a Canadian politician. Ross served as the seventh premier of Quebec and later as a member of the Senate of Canada.

Personal life
Ross was born in Quebec City, Canada. He was the son of a Scots-Quebecer merchant, George McIntosh Ross, and his French-Canadian wife Sophie-Éloïse Gouin.

Political career

Province of Canada Assembly

Ross belonged to the Parti bleu and was elected to the Legislative Assembly of the Province of Canada for the district of Champlain in 1861. He was re-elected in 1863 and served until 1867.

Provincial politics

Ross was elected to the newly established Legislative Assembly of Quebec for the district of Champlain in 1867, but resigned only a few months later to become a Conservative Member of the Legislative Council of Quebec for Shawinigan. From 1873 to 1874, 1876 to 1878 and 1879 to 1882, Ross served as Speaker of the Legislative Council, of whom he remained a member until his death in 1901.

He was Minister without Portfolio from 1876 to 1878 and from 1879 to 1881, as well as the seventh Premier of Quebec from January 23, 1884, to January 25, 1887,

Federal politics

Ross successfully ran as a Conservative candidate for the district of Champlain in the 1872 federal election, but did not run for re-election in the 1874.

He was appointed to the Senate of Canada for the Division of La Durantaye in 1887 and served as Speaker of that institution from 1891 to 1896.

Ross also was Minister without Portfolio in the federal Cabinet for a couple of months in 1896.

Elections as party leader

He lost the 1886 provincial election as Leader of the Conservative Party of Quebec but remained in power in a minority government until he resigned on January 25, 1887. He died in 1901 in Quebec City.

See also
Politics of Quebec
List of Quebec general elections
Timeline of Quebec history

References 

1831 births
1901 deaths
Politicians from Quebec City
Canadian senators from Quebec
Conservative Party of Canada (1867–1942) MPs
Conservative Party of Canada (1867–1942) senators
Members of the House of Commons of Canada from Quebec
Presidents of the Legislative Council of Quebec
Conservative Party of Quebec MLCs
Members of the King's Privy Council for Canada
Premiers of Quebec
Conservative Party of Quebec MNAs
Speakers of the Senate of Canada
Quebec political party leaders
Canadian people of Scottish descent
Members of the Legislative Assembly of the Province of Canada from Canada East